
Year 221 (CCXXI) was a common year starting on Monday (link will display the full calendar) of the Julian calendar. At the time, it was known as the Year of the Consulship of Gratus and Vitellius (or, less frequently, year 974 Ab urbe condita). The denomination 221 for this year has been used since the early medieval period, when the Anno Domini calendar era became the prevalent method in Europe for naming years.

Events 
 By place 

 Roman Empire 
 June 26 – Emperor Elagabalus adopts his cousin Alexander Severus as his heir, and receives the title of Caesar.
 July – Elagabalus is forced to divorce Aquilia Severa, and marries his third wife Annia Faustina. After five months he returns to Severa, and claims that the original divorce is invalid. The marriage is symbolic, because Elagabalus appears to be homosexual or bisexual. According to the historian Cassius Dio, he has a stable relationship with his chariot driver, the slave Hierocles.

 Asia 
 May 15 – Liu Bei, Chinese warlord and descendant of the imperial clan of the Han Dynasty, proclaims himself emperor in Chengdu, Sichuan, and establishes the state of Shu Han.

Births 
 Liu Ling, Chinese poet and scholar (d. 300)
 Yang Hu, Chinese general and politician (d. 278)

Deaths 
 August 4 – Lady Zhen, Chinese noblewoman (b. 183)
 Dong He (or Youzai), Chinese official and politician
 Mi Zhu, Chinese general and politician (b. 165)
 Yu Jin, Chinese general serving under Cao Cao
 Zhang Fei, Chinese general and politician

References